The 8.8 cm SK C/30 was a German naval gun that was used in World War II.  The SK C/30 guns were intended for smaller warships such as submarine chasers and corvettes.

Description
The SK C/30 had a barrel and breech end-piece with a half-length loose liner and a vertical sliding breech block.  The SK C/30 guns were mounted on a hand-operated MPLC/30 mounting that had a total weight of  including a  shield and a fuze-setting machine.  However they were significantly lighter than the older 8.8 cm SK L/45 naval guns. Captured guns from the Chinese National Revolutionary Army was reverse engineered in 1938 by the Imperial Japanese Army and introduced as Type 99 88 mm AA gun.

Ammunition
Ammunition Types Available:
 Armor Piercing (AP) - 
 High Explosive (HE) - 
 High Explosive Incendiary (HEI)  - 
 Illumination (ILLUM) -

See also
 List of naval guns

Notes

Citations

References

External links

 SK C/30 at Navweaps.com

88 mm artillery
Naval guns of Germany
World War II anti-aircraft guns
Anti-aircraft guns of Germany
Naval anti-aircraft guns
World War II naval weapons
Military equipment introduced in the 1930s